A by-election was held for the New South Wales Legislative Assembly seat of Lakemba on 19 September 1964. It was triggered by the death of Stan Wyatt.

Dates

Results

Stan Wyatt died.

See also
Electoral results for the district of Lakemba
List of New South Wales state by-elections

References

1964 elections in Australia
New South Wales state by-elections
1960s in New South Wales
September 1964 events in Australia